Karl Waller is an American artist whose work has appeared in comic books and roleplaying and collectible card games.

Early life and education
He graduated from the Pennsylvania School of Art in 1987, with a diploma in communication arts.

Career
Karl Waller produced interior illustrations for many Dungeons & Dragons books and Dragon magazine from 1988 to 1998.

He has also produced artwork for other role-playing games including Shadowrun and Earthdawn (FASA), Shatterzone, Torg, and Bloodshadows (West End Games), Aria: Canticle of the Monomyth (Last Unicorn Games), and In Nomine and GURPS (Steve Jackson Games), Vampire: The Masquerade and Wraith: The Oblivion (White Wolf), and Mutants & Masterminds (Green Ronin Publishing).

Waller has also illustrated cards for Last Unicorn Games' collectible card game Heresy: Kingdom Come.

Waller has also worked in the comic book industry, including illustrating the prequel comic book X-Men the Movie: Wolverine.

References

External links
 
 

Living people
Role-playing game artists
Year of birth missing (living people)